Soccer Nelson Inc v Soccer NZ Inc is a cited case in New Zealand regarding the requirement under section 7(4)(b) of the Contractual Remedies Act 1970 that a breach of a contract must be "substantial" for a contract to be cancelled.

Background
Soccer Nelson were in arrears of its membership fees to Soccer NZ, and as a result Soccer NZ planned to exclude the Nelson branch from a national soccer tournament.

Soccer Nelson argued the arrears were not substantial and filed for an injunction for Soccer NZ to let them play in the tournament.

Held
The court ruled the arrears were substantial, entitling them to be excluded from the tournament. However, the court issued an interim injunction, requiring $30,000 to be paid within 7 days.

References

New Zealand contract case law
1997 in New Zealand law
High Court of New Zealand cases
1997 in case law